Selling railway station is on the Dover branch of the Chatham Main Line in England, serving the village of Selling, Kent.

The station and all trains that serve the station are operated by Southeastern.

The station and the line on which it is located were built by the London, Chatham & Dover Railway. Formerly an excellent example of country station architecture, it was destroyed by fire from unknown cause in the early 1990s, shortly before it was to be awarded listed building status. The signal box at the station end of the 'up' (London-bound) platform was closed and dismantled shortly afterwards. The box can today be seen in use at Eythorne railway station on the East Kent Railway.

The station was a filming location in the 1944 film A Canterbury Tale, where it was called "Chillingbourne". Charles Hawtrey (of the Carry On films) played the porter. The station now has few facilities.

Ticketing

The station is now unmanned but was staffed when run by British Rail and was APTIS-equipped until December 1992. Nowadays, a PERTIS passenger-operated ticket machine suffices. This issues 'Permits to Travel' and is situated at the entrance to the westbound platform.

Services
All services at Selling are operated by Southeastern using  EMUs.

The typical off-peak service in trains per hour is:
 1 tph to  via 
 1 tph to 

During the peak hours, the service is increased to 2 tph.

References

External links

Railway stations in Swale
DfT Category F1 stations
Former London, Chatham and Dover Railway stations
Railway stations in Great Britain opened in 1860
Railway stations served by Southeastern